Valerie Levesque is an American former TV news reporter for KYW-TV in Philadelphia, Pennsylvania.  She joined the station in March 2003 from WHP-TV and WLYH-TV in Harrisburg, Pennsylvania. Levesque has also been a freelance reporter for the World Business Review based in Washington D.C. since April, 2000.

Previously, Levesque worked as an anchor for WMDT, the ABC station in Salisbury, Maryland. She began her career at WNBC in New York City in 1996.

Levesque is a graduate of the State University of New York at Oswego where she earned two Bachelor of Arts degrees, in Broadcasting and Mass Communication and in Modern Spanish Language and Literature. She is proficient in Spanish. A native of New York State, Levesque now lives with her husband Chris in Philadelphia.

References

External links
 Valerie Levesque, at philadelphia.cbslocal.com

Living people
1974 births
Philadelphia television reporters